Robert Evans (born November 17, 1967) is an American photographer.  Photographing professionally since the age of twenty, he is best known for his work as a celebrity wedding photographer, which includes the weddings of Brad Pitt and Jennifer Aniston and Tom Cruise and Katie Holmes.

Biography 

Growing up in Encino, California, Evans first began working in a small color processing lab in Hollywood after graduating from high school. From there, he went to work for a large portrait studio that had an opening in their wedding department. He photographed his first wedding in January 1989.  He worked for three photography studios subsequent to that before forming Robert Evans Studios in 1994. Robert Evans was invited to become a Sony Artisan of Imagery in 2012, one of a handful of photographers that Sony recognizes as the best in their field.

Evans has photographed the weddings and milestones of some of the most famous celebrities in the world including Tom Cruise, Katie Holmes, Brad Pitt, Jennifer Aniston, Shania Twain, Trent Reznor, Miranda Lambert, Blake Shelton, Jim Carrey, Jenny McCarthy and Christina Aguilera.

His photos have been featured on the covers and in the content of USA Today, People Magazine, Playboy, Us Weekly, Hello Magazine, Ok! Magazine, Life & Style, In Touch, Martha Stewart Weddings and Modern Bride. His work has been showcased on Good Morning America, The Oprah Winfrey Show, Late Night With Jimmy Fallon, Entertainment Tonight, Access Hollywood, Extra, MTV and CNN.

Evans has also served as a contributing writer for Inside Wedding Magazine, and The Huffington Post.

References 

1967 births
Living people
Photographers from California
People from Encino, Los Angeles
Wedding photographers